Lagocephalus sceleratus (Gmelin, 1789), commonly known as the silver-cheeked toadfish, or Sennin-fugu, is an extremely poisonous marine bony fish in the family  Tetraodontidae (puffer fishes).

Habitat and distribution
The species is common in the tropical waters of the Indian and Pacific oceans. In the Mediterranean Sea, it is an invasive species likely introduced via Suez Canal. It has been caught off the coasts of Israel, the south of Turkey, in Cyprus, the south coasts of mainland Greece, Crete, and Rhodes. In 2013 it was reported off the waters off Lampedusa Island in the central Mediterranean, and in 2015 off Malta and also in Montenegro, southeastern Adriatic Sea. Currently the westernmost record is from the Strait of Gibraltar.

Greek authorities sent out an alert about the fish. A few days before 9th of February 2022, a specimen was caught by Croatian fishermen near the island of Pašman in the Adriatic with the Croatian Institute of Oceanography and Fisheries issuing a warning on its Facebook page about the dangers of handling and consuming the fish.

In December 2018, "A Semana", a Cape Verde Island paper published that this fish was caught in its waters (West Africa). Thus, an alert went out to all fisherman and the general population on the fatal dangers of consuming this fish  (https://asemana.publ.cv/?Autoridades-alertam-para-risco-de-peixe-sapo-venenoso-nas-aguas-de-Cabo-Verde&ak=1).

Description
The silver-cheeked toadfish is very similar to the oceanic pufferfish but more elongated and with a symmetrical caudal (tail) fin. Its back is grey or brown with darker spots and it has a white belly. A characteristic silver band runs along the sides of the fish.

Feeding
The silver-cheeked toadfish preys upon benthic invertebrates.

Reproduction
Eggs and larvae are found in the pelagic zone.

Danger to humans
Similar to other puffer fishes, the silver-cheeked toadfish is extremely poisonous if eaten because it contains tetrodotoxin in its ovaries and to a lesser extent its skin, muscles and liver, which protects it from voracious predators. It becomes toxic as it eats bacteria that contain the toxin. This deadly substance causes paralysis of involuntary muscles, which may cause its victims to stop breathing or induce heart failure. Fatal intoxications have been reported in Egypt and Israel.

Notes and references

External links

Species identification form from CIESM 
.
Mother and son critical after eating silver-cheeked toadfish 
 

Lagocephalus
Fish described in 1789
Taxa named by Johann Friedrich Gmelin
Invasive species in the Mediterranean Sea